Haft Tan may refer to:
 Haft Tan, Amol, Mazandaran Province
 Haft Tan, Qaem Shahr, Mazandaran Province